Sárospatak is a district in north-eastern part of Borsod-Abaúj-Zemplén County. Sárospatak is also the name of the town where the district seat is found. The district is located in the Northern Hungary Statistical Region.

Geography 
Sárospatak District borders with Sátoraljaújhely District to the north, Cigánd District to the east, Ibrány District and Nyíregyháza District (Szabolcs-Szatmár-Bereg County) to the south, Tokaj District and Gönc District to the west. The number of the inhabited places in Sárospatak District is 16.

Municipalities 
The district has 1 town and 15 villages.
(ordered by population, as of 1 January 2012)

The bolded municipality is the city.

Demographics

In 2011, it had a population of 24,946 and the population density was 52/km².

Ethnicity
Besides the Hungarian majority, the main minorities are the Roma (approx. 1,500), German (650) and Rusyn (350).

Total population (2011 census): 24,946
Ethnic groups (2011 census): Identified themselves: 23,789 persons:
Hungarians: 21,009 (88.31%)
Gypsies: 1,502 (6.31%)
Germans: 629 (2.64%)
Rusyns: 359 (1.51%)
Others and indefinable: 290 (1.22%)
Approx. 1,000 persons in Sárospatak District did not declare their ethnic group at the 2011 census.

Religion
Religious adherence in the county according to 2011 census:

Catholic – 11,714 (Roman Catholic – 8,376; Greek Catholic – 3,331); 
Reformed – 5,600;
Evangelical – 36;
other religions – 332; 
Non-religious – 1,009; 
Atheism – 100;
Undeclared – 6,155.

Gallery

See also
List of cities and towns of Hungary

References

External links
 Postal codes of the Sárospatak District

Districts in Borsod-Abaúj-Zemplén County